Hacienda Santa Rita is located in the municipality of Guánica, Puerto Rico. It is also known as Casa Madre y Noviciado de las Hermanas Dominicas de Fatima and was built in 1800 by Don Mariano Quiñonez.

It was listed on the U.S. National Register of Historic Places in 1984.

It consists of buildings of a former sugar plantation, including a main house and slave quarters.

During the Spanish–American War in 1898 the building was used by the Spanish military and then by the Americans. Generals Guy Vernor Henry and A. Garreston stayed at the house.

From 1953 on it was used by, and from 1962 owned by, the Dominican Order of Our Lady of Fatima.  The main house has been used as a convent and novice house.

Notes

References

National Register of Historic Places in Puerto Rico
Houses completed in 1800
Sugar plantations in the Caribbean
Slave cabins and quarters
Santa Rita
Convents in North America
Catholic Church in Puerto Rico
1800s establishments in Puerto Rico
1800 establishments in New Spain
Sugar industry in Puerto Rico